The Museo de la Nación (English: Museum of the Nation) is one of two major museums of Peruvian history in Lima, Peru. It is much larger than the other main museum in Lima, the Peruvian National Museum of Archaeology, Anthropology, and History. Currently it is no longer being used as a museum, carrying only very sporadic exhibitions.

The Museum of the Nation housed thousands of artifacts spanning the entire span of human occupation in Peru, including an impressive collection of Moche, Nazca, and Wari ceramics. The museum also houses reproductions of many famous ancient Andean artifacts, most notably the Lanzón from Chavín de Huantar ; a recreation of the burial chamber of the Lord of Sipan (El Señor de Sipán); and the famous Revolt of the Objects Mural. However it is closed and being treated as the office of the Ministry of Culture.

The only permanent exhibit that remains open is on the 6th floor of the museum which houses the photographic exhibit Yuyanapaq. Para Recordar. This exhibit was created by the Truth and Reconciliation Commission to document the internal conflict in Peru that occurred from 1980 to 2000 involving the Shining Path.

See also 
 List of museums in Peru

References

External links

 

Nation, Museum of the
Peru